Pechera is a village in Tulchyn Raion of Vinnytsia Oblast of Ukraine, located along the Southern Bug river in the Tulchin region (formerly Shpikov region). The population is 1,141 people.

History 
The name of the village comes from the cave passages, which served as shelter for the inhabitants of the settlement from the constant attacks of enemies.

During World War II, it is the site of the Pechora concentration camp where thousands of Jews were murdered.

Gallery

References 

Tulchyn Raion

Villages in Tulchyn Raion